Robert Daniel McDonald (January 4, 1923 – October 29, 1977) was a Canadian professional ice hockey right winger who played in one National Hockey League game for the New York Rangers during the 1943–44 season, on January 6, 1944 against the Detroit Red Wings. The rest of his career, which lasted from 1943 to 1949, was spent in the minor leagues. He was born in Toronto, Ontario.

Career statistics

Regular season and playoffs

See also
 List of players who played only one game in the NHL

External links

1923 births
1977 deaths
Canadian expatriate ice hockey players in the United States
Canadian ice hockey right wingers
Detroit Auto Club players
Detroit Bright's Goodyears players
New York Rangers players
New York Rovers players
Ice hockey people from Toronto